Miro Bilan (born July 21, 1989) is a Croatian professional basketball player for Peristeri of the Greek Basket League.

Playing history
Bilan started his career in his hometown, playing for Šibenik from the start of 2006 until January 2010 season when he signed 3 year-deal for Zadar. In Zadar Bilan proved to be one of the most promising young centers in Croatia, becoming subject of interest from major clubs. As Zadar fell into financial troubles, failing to pay their players on time, Bilan one-sidely parted ways with the team.

In August 2011, he signed a contract with Cedevita. Zadar suspended Bilan but eventually he won Croatian Basketball Federation arbitration dispute, allowing him to debut for Cedevita in September 2011. In July 2014, he extended his contract with Cedevita for one more season.

On May 5, 2015, he agreed to a new two-year contract with Cedevita. The 2015–16 season was until then his most successful season. He was one of Cedevita's key players in its EuroLeague Top 16 run and was named ABA League MVP. In spite rumors he will continue his career abroad, in July 2016 he signed a new one-year contract with Cedevita.

On October 19, 2017, Bilan signed with French club SIG Strasbourg for the rest of the 2017–18 season. In 35 games in LNB Pro A he averaged 13 points, 6.4 rebound and 2.1 assists in 23.2 minutes per game.
In 16 games in Basketball Champions League he averaged 10.3 points, 6.4 rebounds and 1 assist in 22.7 minutes per game. 

On July 30, 2018, Bilan signed with French club ASVEL. In 44 games in LNB Pro A he averaged 11.5 points, 5.9 rebounds and 1.6 assists in 22.3 minutes per game. 
In 18 EuroCup games he averaged 10.6 points, 6.1 rebounds and 1.1 assists in 21.3 minutes per game.  He was named member of the All–7DAYS EuroCup Second Team for the 2018/19 season.

On July 13, 2019, he has signed with Dinamo Sassari of the Lega Basket Serie A (LBA). In 2019/2020 season he averaged 14 points, 6.4 rebounds and 1.6 assists in 25 minutes per game.
In 2020/2021 season he averaged 16.5 points, 7.9 rebounds and 1.9 assists in 27 minutes per game,  earning Lega Basket Seria A (LBA) first team award.

On September 23, 2021, he signed in Ukraine with BC Prometey. In 23 games, Bilan averaged 10.3 points, 7.1 rebounds, and 1.6 assists in 18:54 minutes per game.

On March 7, 2022, he signed back with Dinamo Sassari of the Lega Basket Serie A (LBA). In 18 games he averaged 15.6 points, 8.1 rebounds, and 1.6 assists in 24.6 minutes per game.

On June 25, 2022, Bilan officially signed with Peristeri of the Greek Basket League.

Croatian national team
Bilan was a part of the Croatian U-18 and U-20 teams as well as Croatian B national side. He made his debut for the senior Croatian national basketball team in August 2014 in a friendly against Canada. He was the last player to be removed from the preliminary squad for the 2014 World Cup. He represented Croatia at the EuroBasket 2015, where they were eliminated in the eighth finals by Czech Republic. At this tournament he was the third choice for the center position and did not spend much time on court. A year later, after Ante Tomić and Justin Hamilton canceled playing in the tournament, he became the first-choice center in Croatia's successful appearance at the 2016 FIBA World Olympic Qualifying Tournament. He played at the 2016 Summer Olympics where Croatia came 5th. He rejected the call-up for the 2017 EuroBasket, but played again for the Croatia national basketball team at the 2019 FIBA Basketball World Cup qualification games.

Career statistics

EuroLeague

|-
| style="text-align:left;"| 2012–13
| style="text-align:left;" rowspan=3| Cedevita
| 9 || 8 || 19.1 || .596 || .000 || .500 || 6.0 || .3 || .3 || .2 || 8.8 || 11.4
|-
| style="text-align:left;"| 2014–15
| 10 || 10 || 25.3 || .549 || .000 || .714 || 6.6 || 1.2|| .4 || .0 || 12.5 || 15.4
|-
| style="text-align:left;"| 2015–16
| 24 || 24 || 25.6 || .554 || .333 || .625 || 6.1 || 2.0|| .7 || .3 || 13.1 || 15.5
|- class="sortbottom"
| style="text-align:center;" colspan=2| Career
| 43 || 42 || 24.2 || .561 || .300 || .628 || 6.2 || 1.5 || .5 || .2 || 12.2 || 14.6

References

/*11. https://en.wikipedia.org/wiki/Kre%C5%A1imir_%C4%86osi%C4%87_Cup*/

/*12. http://web.legabasket.it/news/127777/ecco_il_miglior_quintetto_della_stagione_regolare_targato_fastweb*/

External links
Miro Bilan at aba-liga.com
Miro Bilan at euroleague.net
Miro Bilan at fiba.com

1989 births
Living people
ABA League players
ASVEL Basket players
Basketball players at the 2016 Summer Olympics
Basketball players from Šibenik
BC Prometey players
Centers (basketball)
Croatian expatriate basketball people in France
Croatian expatriate basketball people in Greece
Croatian expatriate basketball people in Italy
Croatian men's basketball players
Dinamo Sassari players
KK Cedevita players
KK Šibenik players
KK Zadar players
Lega Basket Serie A players
Olympic basketball players of Croatia
Peristeri B.C. players
SIG Basket players